Mikhail Andreyevich Plaksin (Russian: Михаил Андреевич Плаксин; born 1929) is a Russian rower who represented the Soviet Union. He competed at the 1952 Summer Olympics in Helsinki with the men's coxless pair where they were eliminated in the round one repêchage.

References

External links
 

1929 births
Possibly living people
Soviet male rowers
Olympic rowers of the Soviet Union
Rowers at the 1952 Summer Olympics